is a railway operator in Osaka Prefecture, Japan.

The , established on 11 December 1967, is majorly owned by Hankyu. Kitakyu, as it is often abbreviated, also owns various commercial and residential properties along the line.

Stations on the Kitakyu Namboku Line

Notes

Former line
Kaijō Line (Senri-Chūō - )

Rolling stock 

 8000 series (since 1987)
 9000 series (since 28 April 2014)

Former rolling stock
 2000 series (from 1969 until 1993)
 7000/8000 series (from 1969 until 1970)

History
The line was opened on 24 February 1970, to connect the then northern terminus of the Midōsuji Line, with the grounds of the 1970 World's Fair.

Takeo Miki, then Minister of International Trade and Industry, brokered the deal creating the railway as a joint venture between the City of Osaka and Hankyu Railway. Although the line was originally envisioned as a straightforward extension of the Midosuji Line, the city government was unable to independently complete the extension because it went beyond municipal boundaries, thus raising issues of expropriation and financing.

The tracks between Senri-Chuo and the Expo Park were removed following the Expo, and the right-of-way repurposed as part of the Chugoku Expressway.

Since the late 1980s, there has been a plan to extend the line 2.5 km northward from Senri-Chuo to a new station in the city of Minoh. The Minoh municipal government exchanged a letter of confirmation with Hankyu and Kitakyu regarding studies of the extension in 2011, and the government of Osaka Prefecture joined a four-party memorandum of understanding in 2012. As of early 2016, the extension was not yet finalized or funded.

Completion of the extension was originally scheduled for 2020; in May 2019, the extension's scheduled opening date was delayed to 2023 because of construction problems. The scheduled opening of the extension is currently set for the end of 2023.

References

External links

  

Rail transport in Osaka Prefecture
Railway companies of Japan
Railway companies established in 1967
1967 establishments in Japan